Hindi-Urdu, also known as Hindustani, has three noun cases (nominative, oblique, and vocative)  and five pronoun cases (nominative, accusative, dative, genitive, and oblique). The oblique case in pronouns has three subdivisions: Regular, Ergative, and Genitive. There are eight case-marking postpositions in Hindi and out of those eight the ones which end in the vowel -ā (the semblative and the genitive postpositions) also decline according to number, gender, and case.

Nouns 
All the case declension paradigms for nouns are shown below.

Pronouns 
The declension of all the pronouns of Hindi-Urdu are mentioned in the table below:

Personal Pronouns

Demonstrative, Relative, Interrogative Pronouns 

1 Rarely used in Urdu.

Possessive Pronouns 

Note: The formal 2nd person pronoun आप آپ (āp) does not have possessive pronoun forms, instead the genitive postposition का کا (kā) is used with the oblique case to form the possessive pronoun.

Postpositions 
The case-marking postpositions of Hindi-Urdu are mentioned in the table below on the left, and the declensions of the genitive and semblative postpositions are on the right:

Verbs 
In the table below, ø represents the verbal root and suffixes are added to the verb roots to construct different participles and other verbal forms.

See also 
Hindustani grammar
Hindustani phonology
Hindustani etymology
Hindustani orthography

References 

Hindustani language
Hindi
Urdu
Hindi languages
Declension